One way of attributing greenhouse gas (GHG) emissions is to measure the embedded emissions of goods that are being consumed (also referred to as "embodied emissions", "embodied carbon emissions", or "embodied carbon"). This is different from the question of to what extent the policies of one country to reduce emissions affect emissions in other countries (the "spillover effect" and "carbon leakage" of an emissions reduction policy). The UNFCCC measures emissions according to production, rather than consumption. Consequently, embedded emissions on imported goods are attributed to the exporting, rather than the importing, country. The question of whether to measure emissions on production instead of consumption is partly an issue of equity, i.e., who is responsible for emissions.

The 37 Parties listed in Annex B to the Kyoto Protocol have agreed to legally binding emission reduction commitments. Under the UNFCCC accounting of emissions, their emission reduction commitments do not include emissions attributable to their imports. In a briefing note, Wang and Watson (2007) asked the question, "who owns China's carbon emissions?". In their study, they suggested that nearly a quarter of China's CO2 emissions might be a result of its production of goods for export, primarily to the US but also to Europe. Based on this, they suggested that international negotiations based on within country emissions (i.e., emissions measured by production) may be "[missing] the point".

Recent research confirms that, in 2004, 23% of global emissions were embedded in goods traded internationally, mostly flowing from China and other developing countries, such as Russia and South Africa, to the U.S., Europe and Japan. These states are included in a group of ten, as well as the Middle East, that make up 71% of the total difference in regional emissions. In Western Europe the difference in the import and export of emissions is particularly pronounced, with imported emissions making up 20-50% of consumed emissions. The majority of the emissions transferred between these states is contained in the trade of machinery, electronics, chemicals, rubber and plastics.

Research by the Carbon Trust in 2011 revealed that approximately 25% of all  emissions from human activities 'flow' (i.e. are imported or exported) from one country to another. The flow of carbon was found to be roughly 50% emissions associated with trade in commodities such as steel, cement, and chemicals, and 50% in semi-finished/finished products such as motor vehicles, clothing or industrial machinery and equipment.

Embodied carbon in construction 
The embodied carbon of buildings is estimated to count for 11% of global carbon emissions and 75% of a building's emissions over its entire lifecycle. The World Green Building Council has set a target for all new buildings to have at least 40% less embodied carbon.

A life-cycle assessment for embodied carbon calculates the carbon used throughout each stage of a building's life: construction, use and maintenance, and demolition or disassembly.

Re-use is a key consideration when addressing embodied carbon in construction. The architect Carl Elefante is known for coining the phrase, "The greenest building is the building that is already built." The reason that existing buildings are usually more sustainable than new buildings is that the quantity of carbon emissions which occurs during construction of a new building is large in comparison to the annual operating emissions of the building, especially as operations become more energy efficient and energy supplies transition to renewable generation.

Beyond re-use, there are two principal areas of focus in the reduction of embodied carbon in construction. The first is to reduce the quantity of construction material ('construction mass') while the second is the substitution of lower carbon alternative materials. Typically—where reduction of embodied carbon is a goal—both of these are addressed.

Often, the most significant scope for reduction of construction mass is found in structural design, where measures such as reduced beam or slab span (and an associated increase in column density) can yield large carbon savings.

To assist material substitution (with low carbon alternatives), manufacturers of materials such as steel re-bar, glulam, and precast concrete typically provide Environmental Product Declarations (EPD) which certify the carbon impact as well as general environmental impacts of their products. Minimizing the use of carbon-intensive materials may mean selecting lower carbon versions of glass and steel products, and products manufactured using low-emissions energy sources. Embodied carbon may be reduced in concrete construction through the use of Portland cement alternatives such as Ground granulated blast-furnace slag, recycled aggregates and industry by-products. Carbon-neutral, carbon positive, and carbon-storing materials include bio-based materials such as timber, bamboo, hemp fibre and hempcrete, wool, dense-pack cellulose insulation, and cork.

A 2021 study focused on "carbon-intensive hotspot materials (e.g., concrete foundations and slab floors, insulated roof and wall panels, and structural framing) in light industrial buildings" estimated that a "sizable reduction (~60%) in embodied carbon is possible in two to three years by bringing readily-available low-carbon materials into wider use".

Embodied carbon policy and legislation 

A variety of policies, regulations, and standards exist worldwide with respect to embodied carbon, according to the American Institute of Architects.

Eight states introduced procurement policies related to embodied carbon in 2021: Washington, Oregon, California, Colorado, Minnesota, Connecticut, New York, and New Jersey.

In Colorado, HB21-1303: Global Warming Potential for Public Project Materials (better known as “Buy Clean Colorado”) was signed into law July 6, 2021. The law uses environmental product declarations (EPDs) to help drive the use of low-embodied-carbon materials.

"In Europe, embodied carbon emissions have been limited in the Netherlands since 2018, and this is scheduled to happen in Denmark, Sweden, France and Finland between 2023 and 2027."

See also 
Emissions embodied in international trade
Embodied energy

References

External links 
 Resources: Embodied Carbon in Buildings, Boston Society for Architecture
 Ten Steps Towards Reducing Embodied Carbon, The American Institute of Architects
Carbon Positive Reset! 1.5° C 2020 Teach-In
Carbon Smart Materials Palette

Climate change policy
Greenhouse gas emissions
Carbon
Climate change mitigation
Sustainable building